Tabrikiekondre is a village in Boven Saramacca municipality (resort) in Sipaliwini District in Suriname.

Nearby towns and villages include Moetoetoetabriki (4.1 nm), Kwattahede (3.0 nm), La Valere (13.6 nm), Warnakomoponafaja (5.1 nm) and Makajapingo (3.2 nm).

References

Populated places in Sipaliwini District